Raúl Omar Rossi (August 13, 1938 – February 2, 2003) was a prelate of the Roman Catholic Church. He served as auxiliary bishop of Buenos Aires from 1992 till 2000, when he became bishop of San Martín.

Life 
Born in Gualeguaychú, Rossi was ordained to the priesthood on December 3, 1966.

On May 20, 1992, he was appointed auxiliary bishop of Buenos Aires and titular bishop of Enera. Rossi received his episcopal consecration on the following June 27, together with the future Pope Francis, who was also consecrated a bishop at that time, from Antonio Cardinal Quarracino, archbishop of Buenos Aires, with the auxiliary bishop of Buenos Aires, Mario José Serra, and the auxiliary bishop of Buenos Aires, Eduardo Vicente Mirás, serving as co-consecrators.

On February 22, 2000, he was appointed bishop of San Martín, where he was installed on the following May 1.

He died on 2 February 2003.

References

External links 
 Entry about Raúl Omar Rossi at catholic-hierarchy.org 

1938 births
2003 deaths
20th-century Roman Catholic bishops in Argentina
21st-century Roman Catholic bishops in Argentina
Roman Catholic bishops of San Martín in Argentina
Roman Catholic bishops of Buenos Aires